Steffen Roth (born 8 August 1976 in Würzburg) is an academic and author on management, economics, and sociology. He is currently Full Professor of Management at the La Rochelle Business School and Full Professor of Social Science as well as President of the Senate of Kazimieras Simonavičius University.

Academic Background

Roth earned his Diploma in Sociology from Chemnitz University of Technology in 2002, his PhD in Economics and Management (Dr. rer. pol) from the same university in 2010, and his PhD in Sociology from the University of Geneva in 2013. He holds a Habilitation (facultas docendi) in Economic and Environmental Sociology awarded by the Italian Ministry of Education, University, and Research and the Title of Docent (venia legendi) of Economic Sociology from the University of Turku.

Career

From 2010-2011, Roth was Visiting Professor and Open Society Institute and Soros Foundations Network Academic Fellow at the Yerevan State University Department of Sociology. From 2012 to 2016 and 2017, respectively, he was tenured Assistant Professor of Management and Organization at the ESC Rennes School of Business and Visiting Professor at the International University of Rabat. 
As of 2021, he has been a Visiting Professor of Management and Organization at the University of Witten-Herdecke.

Research

Roth is a social systems theorist influenced by the works of Niklas Luhmann. His research focus is on theories and applications of functional differentiation in modern societies. Roth was among the first to apply culturomics in sociology, with one major result of this research being that the (self-) definition of modern societies as capitalist or economized may be inappropriate. Further fields of research include multifunctional organizations and markets, the digital transformation of social theory, and foresight and future studies.

Service to the Scientific Community

Roth has been an Associate Editor of Kybernetes, and is the Field Editor for social systems theory of Systems Research and Behavioral Science as well as a Member of the Editorial Board of Sociology and Cybernetics and Human Knowing.
Roth is also a member of the Executive Committee of the Inter-University Center Dubrovnik.

External links

 Official site

References

Living people
1976 births
Degrowth advocates
University of Geneva alumni